The Navarre autonomous football team is the regional football team for Navarre, Spain. It is not affiliated with FIFA or UEFA because it is represented internationally by the Spain national team, and only plays in friendly matches.

History
The Navarre Football Federation created its selection in 2003. Until then, the Navarran players had been playing for the Basque national team. The Navarre national team played their first international game on 28 December 2003, debuting against Burkina Faso. The match ended in a 4-0 win, with the author of the team's first-ever goal being Txiki Acaz, while De Carlos scored a brace. They followed it up with two more matches in the next two years, both also being held in December. In 2004 they beat Morocco 2-1 with another goal from De Carlos and in their last match on 26 December 2005, they managed to keep their 100% winning status by defeating China PR 1-0, with the hero of the game being Iñaki Muñoz, who netted the lonely goal in the second-half.

Selected internationals

List of players

Navarre women's autonomous football team

Results

See also
 Basque Country national football team
 Basque Country women's national football team
:Category:Footballers from Navarre

References

External links
List of matches at RoonBa

 

Autonomous football team
Navarre
European national and official selection-teams not affiliated to FIFA
Sports organizations established in 2003
2003 establishments in Spain